Jobie Nutarak (May 10, 1947 – April 22, 2006) was a politician from Nunavut in northern Canada.

Biography 
Nutarak was born in Pond Inlet on Baffin Island. He was elected to the district of Tunnuniq in 1999 and was re-elected in 2004. In 2004 he was elected to the position of Speaker of the Legislative Assembly of Nunavut, being the first unilingual Inuktitut speaking person to hold the position. Prior to territorial politics, Nutarak was involved in local and regional education and active with Inuit land claims organizations.

Nutarak died while on a snowmobile hunting trip, leaving behind a wife and five children along with five grandchildren.

References

External links
Jobie Nutarak at the Legislative Assembly of Nunavut

1947 births
2006 deaths
Inuit from the Northwest Territories
Inuit politicians
Members of the Legislative Assembly of Nunavut
21st-century Canadian politicians
People from Pond Inlet
Baffin Island
Accidental deaths in Nunavut
Speakers of the Legislative Assembly of Nunavut
Inuit from Nunavut